Michał Borecki (born 5 March 1997) is a Polish professional footballer who plays as a midfielder for KKS Kalisz.

Club career

In 2013, Borecki joined the youth academy of Italian Serie A side Lazio, where he suffered an injury.

Before the second half of 2016/17, he signed for Chrobry Głogów in the Polish second division, where he made 43 league appearances and scored 4 goals.

In 2019, Borecki signed for Polish fourth division club KKS Kalisz.

International career
Borecki has been capped by Poland at under-16, under-17, under-18 and under-19 levels.

References

External links
 
 
 

Living people
1997 births
Polish footballers
Poland youth international footballers
Association football midfielders
Chrobry Głogów players
I liga players
II liga players
III liga players
Polish expatriate footballers
Polish expatriate sportspeople in Italy
Expatriate footballers in Italy
People from Inowrocław